Katherine Emeline Langley (née Gudger; February 14, 1888 – August 15, 1948) was an American politician. Langley was a member of United States House of Representatives from Kentucky during the Seventieth and Seventy-first sessions of Congress. She was the wife of Kentucky politician John W. Langley and daughter of James M. Gudger, Jr., a four-term Congressman from North Carolina. She was the first woman elected to Congress from Kentucky.

Family life and education
Langley was born near Marshall in Madison County, North Carolina on February 14, 1888, to James Madison Gudger and Katherine Hawkins. She graduated in 1901 from the Woman's College, Richmond, Virginia and attended Emerson College of Oratory.

Political career
Langley taught at the Virginia Institute at Bristol, TN and worked as a secretary for her father before marrying John Langley and moving to Pikeville, Kentucky in 1905. She had three children: Katherine Langley Bentley, John Jr., and Susanna.

Katherine Langley served as chairman of the Pike County Red Cross Society during the First World War. Moving to Washington D.C. in 1907, she served as secretary for her husband for the eighteen years he served as the Republican representative for the 10th District. She held numerous appointed and elected public positions including vice chairman of the Republican State Central Committee of Kentucky 1920–1922—she was the first woman member of that committee and founded the Kentucky Woman's Republican State Committee which she chaired in 1920. She served as an alternate delegate to the Republican National Convention in 1920 and delegate in 1924. She clerked for the Committee on Public Buildings and Grounds which her husband chaired. John Langley was convicted of violating the Volstead Act by selling alcohol illegally and trying to bribe a federal officer. After his appeal was denied by the U.S. Supreme Court, in 1926 he resigned from his office in Congress as Kentucky's representative for the 10th District. Katherine Langley ran on the Republican ticket using her husband's arrest as part of a government conspiracy, and she soundly defeated her husband's successor, Andrew J. Kirk, in the primary.

Langley was elected by a healthy majority of votes twice to the United States House of Representatives as a representative from Kentucky during the Seventieth and Seventy-first sessions of Congress, serving from March 4, 1927, through March 3, 1931. Because of her husband's conviction and disgraceful resignation, she was marginalized in social circles that once had accommodated her flamboyant style: a reporter wrote of "her unstinted display of gypsy colors on the floor." Her physical presence became the target of derision by the Washington elite, and her Kentucky-style oratory was also attacked. During her tenure as a Representative, she missed a third (52 out of 174) of the roll-call votes. Her committee appointments were Claims, Invalid Pensions, and Immigration and Naturalization as well as the Committee on Education. While in Congress she supported women's issues and advocated for the creation of a cabinet-level department of education. In 1930 Katherine Langley was the first woman to serve on the Republican Committee on Committees in the U.S. House of Representatives.

Once her husband announced he would try to run for office again, her support among her constituents withered. There are no records that show they ran against each other in the primaries, but the connection that had once propelled her into office was gone. With the rise of the Democrats in Kentucky due to President Hoover's inability to turn around the agricultural depression or impact the depressed coal industry, Katherine Langley narrowly lost her bid for re-election in 1930 to the Democratic contender, Andrew Jackson May.

Later she served as a postmistress and was elected as a district railroad commissioner two times, serving the Third Kentucky District from 1939 to 1942. She was a member of the Daughters of the American Revolution.

Death
Langley died in Pikeville, Kentucky, on August 15, 1948, and is buried in the Johnson Memorial Cemetery, Pikeville, Kentucky.

See also
 Women in the United States House of Representatives 
 John W. Langley

References

Bibliography

External links

 

1888 births
1948 deaths
Emerson College alumni
Female members of the United States House of Representatives
Spouses of Kentucky politicians
Women in Kentucky politics
Republican Party members of the United States House of Representatives from Kentucky
20th-century American politicians
American suffragists
American temperance activists
American feminists
20th-century American women politicians
People from Marshall, North Carolina